Antonio Hamilton (born January 24, 1993) is an American football cornerback for the Arizona Cardinals of the National Football League (NFL). He played college football at South Carolina State.

College career
Hamilton attended South Carolina State University. While there he played for three seasons in a total of 33 games. He recorded 73 tackles, one sack, four interceptions, and nine passes defensed.  In addition, he recorded 33 kickoff returns for 818 yards and two touchdowns as well as 23 punt returns for 498 yards and two touchdowns. As a junior, he earned All-Conference honors as a return specialist.

Professional career

Oakland Raiders
Hamilton was signed by the Oakland Raiders as an undrafted free agent on May 10, 2016.

On October 14, 2017, Hamilton was placed on injured reserve with a knee injury. He was activated off injured reserve to the active roster on December 15, 2017.

On September 1, 2018, Hamilton was waived by the Raiders.

New York Giants
On September 2, 2018, Hamilton was claimed off waivers by the New York Giants. He played in 13 games before being placed on injured reserve on December 18, 2018 with a quad injury.

On March 14, 2019, Hamilton re-signed with the Giants.

Kansas City Chiefs
Hamilton signed with the Kansas City Chiefs on March 23, 2020.

Tampa Bay Buccaneers
On May 17, 2021, Hamilton signed with the Tampa Bay Buccaneers. On August 30, 2021, he was released as part of final roster cuts.

Arizona Cardinals
On September 3, 2021, Hamilton was signed to the Arizona Cardinals practice squad. He was promoted to the active roster on September 29, 2021.

On April 26, 2022, Hamilton re-signed with the Cardinals. He was placed on the reserve/non-football injury list on September 1, 2022. He was activated on October 8.

References

External links
 Kansas City Chiefs bio

1993 births
Living people
People from Johnston, South Carolina
Players of American football from South Carolina
American football cornerbacks
South Carolina State Bulldogs football players
Oakland Raiders players
New York Giants players
Kansas City Chiefs players
Tampa Bay Buccaneers players
Arizona Cardinals players